Clinch Valley Roller Mills is a historic grist mill complex located along the Clinch River at Cedar Bluff, Tazewell County, Virginia. The main building was built about 1856, and consists of a 3 1/2-story, timber frame cinder block with later 19th and early-20th century additions.  There are additions for grain storage; a saw mill, now enclosed and housing the mill office; the mill dam site with its associated culvert, weirs, flume and turbines; and the 1 1/2-story shop building. The main section is believed to have been rebuilt after a fire in 1884.

It was listed on the National Register of Historic Places in 1984.

References

Grinding mills in Virginia
Grinding mills on the National Register of Historic Places in Virginia
Industrial buildings completed in 1856
Buildings and structures in Tazewell County, Virginia
National Register of Historic Places in Tazewell County, Virginia
1856 establishments in Virginia